Carmen Blanco (Lugo, Galicia, Spain, 1954) is a Spanish feminist writer and activist. She is Professor of Galician Literature at the University of Santiago de Compostela. With Claudio Rodriguez Fer she coordinates the intercultural and libertarian journal Unión Libre. Cadernos de vida e culturas and the Asociación para a Dignificación das Vítimas do Fascismo.

Works

Essays
Conversas con Carballo Calero (Vigo, Galaxia, 1989)
Literatura galega da muller (Vigo, Xerais, 1991)
Carballo Calero: política e cultura (Sada, Do Castro, 1991)
Escritoras galegas (Santiago de Compostela, Compostela, 1992)
Libros de mulleres (Vigo, Do Cumio, 1994)
O contradiscurso das mulleres (Vigo, Nigra, 1995, El contradiscurso de las mujeres, Vigo, Nigra, 1997)
Nais, damas, prostitutas e feirantas (Vigo, Xerais, 1995)
Mulleres e independencia (Sada, Do Castro, 1995)
Luz Pozo Garza: a ave do norte (Ourense, Linteo, 2002)
Alba de mulleres (Vigo, Xerais, 2003)
Sexo e lugar (Vigo, Xerais, 2006)
María Mariño. Vida e obra (Vigo, Xerais, 2007)
Casas anarquistas de mulleres libertarias (A Coruña-Santiago de Compostela, CNT, 2007)
Uxío Novoneyra (Vigo, A Nosa Terra, 2009)
Novoneyra: un cantor do Courel a Compostela. O poeta nos lugares dos seus libros (Noia, Toxosoutos, 2010)
Feministas e libertarias (Santiago de Compostela, Meubook, 2010)
Letras lilas (Lugo, Unión Libre, 2019)

Poetry
Estraña estranxeira (A Coruña, Biblioteca Virtual Galega, 2004)
Un mundo de mulleres (Biblos, 2011)
Lobo amor (Unión Libre, 2011)

Prose
Vermella con lobos (Vigo, Xerais, 2004)
Atracción total (Vigo, Xerais, 2008)

Edition and introduction
Xosé Luís Méndez Ferrín, Con pólvora y magnolias (Vigo, Xerais, 1989)
Uxío Novoneyra, Os eidos (Vigo, Xerais, 1990)
Ricardo Carvalho Calero, Uma voz na Galiza (Barcelona, Sotelo Blanco, 1992)
Luz Pozo Garza, Códice Calixtino (Vigo, Xerais, 1992)
Luz Pozo Garza, Historias fidelísimas (Ourense, Linteo, 2003)
Luz Pozo Garza, Memoria solar (Ourense, Linteo, 2004)
Extranjera en su patria. Cuatro poetas gallegos. Rosalía de Castro. Manuel Antonio. Luís Pimentel. Luz Pozo Garza (Barcelona, Círculo de Lectores / Galaxia Gutenberg, 2005)
Día das Letras Galegas 2007. María Mariño Carou (Universidade de Santiago de Compostela, 2007)

References

External links
Unión libre. Cadernos de vida e culturas

1954 births
Living people
People from Lugo
Spanish feminist writers
Galician poets
Galician-language writers
Women writers from Galicia (Spain)
Spanish essayists
Spanish women essayists